Naracoorte is a town in the Limestone Coast region of South Australia, approximately 336 kilometres south-east of Adelaide and 100 kilometres north of Mount Gambier on the Riddoch Highway (A66).

History
Before the colonisation of South Australia in 1836, the land now occupied by the town of Naracoorte was situated on the border of lands occuped by the Bindjali people to the east and Ngarrindjeri to the east. 

Naracoorte was formed from the merger of two towns, Kincraig, founded in 1845 by Scottish explorer William Macintosh, and Narracoorte, established as a government settlement in 1847. The name has gone through a number of spellings, and is believed to be derived from the Aboriginal words for place of running water or large waterhole. It grew during the 1850s as a service town for people going to and from the Victorian gold rush. The Post Office opened on 22 March 1853 and was known as Mosquito Plains until 1861.

The District Council of Naracoorte was proclaimed in August 1870 to locally govern the lands of the Hundred of Naracoorte. In 1888 the size of the district was dramatically expanded to include surrounding areas not yet locally governed. As a consequence, in February 1924 the Corporate Town of Naracoorte was established to provide dedicated local governance to the township.

In 1935 a cinema, the Austral Theatre, designed by Chris A. Smith, opened at 124-140 Smith Street. It was later known as the Rivoli Theatre.

The Kingston-Naracoorte railway line was closed on 28 November 1987 and dismantled on 15 September 1991, followed on 12 April 1995 by the Mount Gambier to Wolseley line, still pending gauge standardisation.

Since 1993 Naracoorte has been locally governed by the amalgamated Naracoorte Lucindale Council. It is in the state electoral district of MacKillop and the federal Division of Barker.

Industry 

The town has historically relied largely on sheep, cattle and wheat farming.

In recent decades, tourism has become a major industry due to the town's proximity to several wine regions and internationally recognised natural features. Both the World-Heritage-listed Naracoorte Caves National Park, the Ramsar-listed Bool and Hacks Lagoons are south of the township. The wine regions of Coonawarra and Wrattonbully lie further south, while the Padthaway lies to the north, placing Naracoorte at the centre of the three.

Other places of interest to tourists include:
The Visitor Information Centre & Sheep's Back Museum – MacDonnell Street
Lions Pioneer Park – MacDonnell Street
Tiny Train Park & Mini Golf – Park Terrace
Naracoorte Art Gallery – Ormerod Street
Mini Jumbuk Centre – 61 Smith Street
Swimming Lake – Moore Street
Jubilee Nature Park – Moore Street
Russet Ridge Winery – Cnr Caves Road and Riddoch Highway
Struan House – Riddoch Highway

Heritage listed sites
Naracoorte has a number of sites listed on the South Australian Heritage Register, including:

 6 Church Street: St Andrew's Presbyterian Church
 DeGaris Place: Commercial Bank of South Australia Building (current council office)
 2 Laurie Crescent: St Paul's Anglican Church
 MacDonnell Street: Simpson's Flour Mill (current Sheep's Back Museum)
 23–25 McDonnell Street: Limbert's Store and Residence
 30 McLeay Street: Dartmoor Homestead
 13 Ormerod Street: Old Naracoorte District Council Chambers
 81 Smith Street: National Bank Building

Services

Schools
There are three schools: Naracoorte High on Stewart Terrace, Naracoorte Primary on Park Terrace and Naracoorte South Primary. Independent schools include Naracoorte Christian School (also called Sunrise Christian School) on Caves Road (formerly on Rolland Street).

Other services
Naracoorte Hospital
Police at 66 Smith Street
Banks – ANZ Bank, Bank SA, Commonwealth Bank, National Bank, People's Choice Credit Union
RAA – Kincraig Motors or Vans Automotive Service
Service stations – MoGas, Mobil, Caltex, Shell and On The Run
Supermarkets – Woolworths, Kincraig Plaza and Foodland
Transport – Bus station at 170 Smith Street
Food services – Naracoorte Pizza House, McDonald's, Sweet Espresso and W T Morris And Son's Bakery

Media

Newspapers 
The town is home to The Naracoorte Herald, a newspaper published in the town (under that name) since 1948. Prior to that, the newspaper had used the older spelling of the town, and was known as The Narracoorte Herald, which had begun publication on 14 December 1875. It was formerly part of Fairfax Media, with the Fairfax regional office located in the town on Smith Street. Since mid 2019 it has been owned by Australian Community Media who purchased the Rural Press publications when Fairfax was bought by Nine.

In 1912, a nearby publication, the Tatiara and Lawloit News (13 June 1908 – 15 June 1912), which also printed in Naracoorte, was absorbed into the Herald.

In May 2020 a new rival paper, "Naracoorte Community News" was launched by Michael Waite to fill the gap left by the suspension of ‘'The Naracoorte Herald'’ during the COVID-19 pandemic.

Television 
 The Australian Broadcasting Corporation (ABC) – ABC, ABC TV Plus (formerly ABC Comedy)/ABC Kids, ABC Me, ABC News (digital channels)
 The Special Broadcasting Service (SBS) – SBS, SBS Viceland, SBS World Movies, SBS Food, SBS WorldWatch, NITV (digital channels)
 WIN Television (7, 9 & 10) as SES-8 – SES-8 relays the programming from Seven Network (Seven SA), Nine Network (Nine SA) & Network 10 (10 SA).
 Foxtel – Subscription Television service Foxtel is also available via satellite.

WIN Television's Channel 10 broadcasts Network Ten programming, Channel Seven broadcasts Seven Network programming & Channel Nine broadcasts Nine Network programming. The programming schedules for these channels is the same as Channel Nine, Channel Seven and Channel Ten in Adelaide, with local commercials inserted and some variations for coverage of Australian Football League or National Rugby League matches, state and national news and current affairs programs, some lifestyle and light entertainment shows and infomercials.

Radio 

ABC
 ABC South East SA (1161 AM)
 ABC Triple J (102.5 FM)
 ABC Radio National (103.3 FM)
 ABC Classic FM (104.1 FM)
 ABC NewsRadio (105.7 FM)
Commercial
 Radio TAB
 SAFM (100.9 FM) (formerly Hit FM)
Community
 5TCB FM (89.7 FM)
 LIME FM (99.3 FM) (Formerly Rhema FM)

Sport
The town has an Australian Rules football team competing in the Kowree-Naracoorte-Tatiara Football League. and also supplies players for a number of surrounding teams such as Kybybolite, Padthaway and Border Districts.

Naracoorte also has a soccer club competing in the Limestone Coast Football Association.

The Naracoorte Racing Club holds thoroughbred horse racing at its track located 4 kilometers from the center of the town.

Notable residents

 Aaron Fiora
 Alex Forster
 Alexander McLachlan
 Alan Rawlinson
 Allan Rodda
 Alice Monfries
 Angus Schumacher
 Ben Johnson
 Cam Sutcliffe 
 Elizee De Garis
 Emily Beaton
 George Ash
 George Byng Scott
 Greg Rowe
 Hattie Shand
 Harvey Jolly
 Indira Naidoo
 Lachie Neale
 Lachlan Busiko
 Lucy Hood
 Jack Trengove
 James Gardiner
 Jessica Trengove
 John Baxter Mather
 Mountifort Conner
 Sam Burston
 Thomas Wilde Boothby
 Park Laurie
 Paul Rofe
 Percy Hutton
 Russell Dumas
 William Shiels

Climate
Naracoorte experiences a warm-summer mediterranean climate (Köppen: Csb, Trewartha: Csbk), with warm, relatively dry summers; mild, relatively dry springs and autumns; and cool winters with moderate precipitation.

References

External links

FairfaxDigital Travel – Naracoorte
Naracoorte Lucindale Council. Retrieved 5 March 2011.

Towns in South Australia
Limestone Coast